Flesselles is a commune in the Somme department in Hauts-de-France in northern France.

Geography
Nearby towns include Montonvillers to the east.

Population

Places of interest
The 17th–18th-century château, with vestiges of the ancient 14th-century fortress at the base of its tower.

Education 
Since October 2011  the „école primaire“ in Flesselles has a Comenius-partnership. Declared school-partners are the Volksschule Altomünster (Germany/Bavaria) and the „Primary School“ in Crook (England). The project-topic is „Healthy Active Citizens Across Europe“.

Personalities
 Max Lejeune, French politician was born at Flesselles in 1909.

See also
Communes of the Somme department

References

External links

 Official website of the commune 

Communes of Somme (department)